

150001–150100 

|-id=035
| 150035 Williamson || 2005 WO || Bruce Williamson (born 1953), American senior technician and precision machinist at the NASA Table Mountain Facility || 
|-id=046
| 150046 Cynthiaconrad ||  || Cynthia A. Conrad (born 1972) is a Senior Specialist at Southwest Research Institute. She served as the Pluto Encounter Logistics Lead for the New Horizons mission to Pluto. || 
|-id=081
| 150081 Steindl ||  || Imre Steindl (1839–1902) was a Hungarian architect, full professor of the Budapest University of Technology, and a member of the Hungarian Academy of Sciences. His most famous work, the Hungarian Parliament Building, is regarded by many as a symbol of the capital city. || 
|}

150101–150200 

|-id=118
| 150118 Petersberg ||  || The Petersberg is a 250-m hill near of Halle (Saale), Germany. On the hill is an Abbey with its church St. Peter, formerly an Augustinian monastery. Since 1999 it has been an evangelical monastic community. The church served as a burial-place for members of the House Wettin, one of the oldest dynasties of German nobility. || 
|-id=129
| 150129 Besshi ||  || Besshi copper mine (Besshi Dōzan), one of the richest copper mines in Japan || 
|-id=145
| 150145 Uvic ||  || The University of Victoria ("UVic"), British Columbia, Canada, home to the Climenhaga Observatory , where this minor planet was discovered || 
|}

150201–150300 

|-bgcolor=#f2f2f2
| colspan=4 align=center | 
|}

150301–150400 

|-id=316
| 150316 Ivaniosifovich ||  || Ivan Iosifovich Ipatov (1927–2015), father of the second discoverer, Sergei I. Ipatov, was one of the founders of the geodetical network of Russia. || 
|-id=374
| 150374 Jasoncook ||  || Jason C. Cook (born 1977), an American scientist at the Southwest Research Institute who worked on the composition team for the New Horizons mission to Pluto. || 
|}

150401–150500 

|-bgcolor=#f2f2f2
| colspan=4 align=center | 
|}

150501–150600 

|-id=520
| 150520 Dong ||  || Feng Dong (born 1979), Chinese-American astronomer with the Sloan Digital Sky Survey || 
|}

150601–150700 

|-bgcolor=#f2f2f2
| colspan=4 align=center | 
|}

150701–150800 

|-bgcolor=#f2f2f2
| colspan=4 align=center | 
|}

150801–150900 

|-bgcolor=#f2f2f2
| colspan=4 align=center | 
|}

150901–151000 

|-bgcolor=#f2f2f2
| colspan=4 align=center | 
|}

References 

150001-151000